Fanfare for a Death Scene is a 1964 American TV movie directed by Leslie Stevens.

Plot
An American secret agent chases after a formula.

Cast
Richard Egan
Telly Savalas
Burgess Meredith

Production
It was originally directed by Walter Graumann who was sacked and replaced by Stevens.

References

External links

1964 television films
1964 films
Films directed by Leslie Stevens
American drama television films
1960s English-language films
1960s American films